Coppenhall is a civil parish in the district of South Staffordshire, Staffordshire, England. It contains three listed buildings that are recorded in the National Heritage List for England. Of these, one is at Grade II*, the middle of the three grades, and the others are at Grade II, the lowest grade.  The parish contains the village of Coppenhall and the surrounding countryside.  The listed buildings consist of a church, a timber framed cottage, and a former windmill.


Key

Buildings

References

Citations

Sources

Lists of listed buildings in Staffordshire
South Staffordshire District